George Fred Williams (July 10, 1852 – July 11, 1932) was a U.S. Representative from Massachusetts and Envoy Extraordinary and Minister Plenipotentiary to both Greece and Montenegro.

Early life and career 
Born in Dedham, Massachusetts, Williams attended private schools, graduated from the Dedham High School in 1868, and from Dartmouth College in 1872. His parents were Captain and Henrietta ( Williams. His mother was a Sunday School teacher at the Allin Congregational Church. He studied at the Universities of Heidelberg and Berlin.  He also studied law at Boston University, Boston, Massachusetts.

He taught school in West Brewster, Massachusetts in 1872 and 1873.  He was also a reporter for the Boston Globe.  He was admitted to the bar in 1875 and practiced in Boston.  He edited Williams' Citations of Massachusetts Cases in 1878 and volumes 10 to 17 of the Annual Digest of the United States 1880 to 1887.

Public life
Initially a Republican, Williams bolted the party in the Mugwump revolt of 1884, and eventually joined the Democratic Party.
He served as member of the Dedham School Committee before being elected to the Massachusetts House of Representatives in 1890.  Williams was elected to the Fifty-second Congress (March 4, 1891 – March 3, 1893) but lost a bid for reelection in 1892 to the Fifty-third Congress.

He resumed the practice of law in Boston, Massachusetts and was an unsuccessful Democratic nominee for governor in 1895, 1896, and 1897.  He served as delegate to several state Democratic conventions and to the Democratic National Conventions in 1896, 1900, 1904 and 1908.  In the 1896 convention, he bucked the state party establishment by abandoning the gold plank supported by the rest of the delegation, and supported William Jennings Bryan for president.  This action did tremendous damage to his future elective prospects within the party.

Williams was appointed Minister to Greece and Montenegro by President Woodrow Wilson, serving in 1914.  He resigned this position after a visit to Albania witnessing the tragic Albanian civilians being murdered and left to die of hunger by the current Greek regime.

Later life
He resumed the practice of law until his retirement in 1930 and died in Brookline, near Boston, July 11, 1932.  He was interred in Dedham's Old Village Cemetery.

References

Works cited

Sources

External links
politicalgraveyard.com
picturehistory.com

1852 births
1932 deaths
Democratic Party members of the Massachusetts House of Representatives
Ambassadors of the United States to Greece
Ambassadors of the United States to Montenegro
Dartmouth College alumni
Politicians from Dedham, Massachusetts
Dedham High School alumni
Democratic Party members of the United States House of Representatives from Massachusetts
Diplomats from Dedham, Massachusetts
Lawyers from Dedham, Massachusetts
Boston University School of Law alumni
Burials at Old Village Cemetery